Rizwan Ali Jaffri is a Pakistani model, actor and singer. He is best known for his modeling work with renowned Pakistani fashion labels, he also mark his television debut in 2012 drama serial Pani Jaisa Piyar directed by Sarmad Sultan Khoosat. He mark his singing debut with his album Yaran Di Toli in 2013, which earned him a Lux Style Award for Best Music Album of the Year at 13th Lux Style Awards.

Personal life
Rizwan Ali Jaffri born to  Punjabi Muslim parents in Lahore, Punjab on October 18, 1983

Career
Ali Jaffri established himself as a model and then earned a status of super model, according to his accounts, his entrance in fashion industry was due to his friends, since he has a long hair, admired model body and good looks.

Filmography
Following is the list of selected dramas of Ali:

 Humari Betiya
 Deewan-e-Muhabbat
 Pani Jaisa Pyaar
 Ghar AIk Jannat
Rukhsathi
 Chal Dil Mere
 Kuch Ishq Tha Kuch Majboori Thi
 Chalo Phir Se Jee Kar Daikhain
 Main Soteli
 Yeh Pyaar Hai
 Jalaan
Mohabbat Zindagi Hai
Darr Khuda Say
Yun Tu Hai Pyar Bohut

Besides drama serials, he appeared in the following movie:
Thora Jee Le

Discography

Ali mark his debut as a singer with following album:

 Yaran Di Toli - 2013

Awards

 4th Pakistan Media Awards - Best Model Male of the Year - won
 13th Lux Style Awards - Best Model Male of the Year - won

References

External links
 
 
 

Living people
Pakistani male models
21st-century Pakistani male actors
21st-century Pakistani male singers
1992 births
Pakistani male television actors